Haplochromis nigripinnis is a species of cichlid found in the Democratic Republic of the Congo and Uganda where it occurs in Lake George, Lake Edward and the Kazinga Channel.  This species can reach a length of  SL.

References

nigripinnis
Fish described in 1921
Taxonomy articles created by Polbot